Two or more segments are tautosyllabic (with each other) if they occur in the same syllable. They can also be described as sharing a 'tautosyllabic distribution'.

Phonemes that are not tautosyllabic are heterosyllabic.

See also
Ambisyllabicity, sounds that are arguably shared between two syllables (such as 'rr' in British English "hurry")

References
 

Phonotactics